Erik Ihorovych Shuranov (born 22 February 2002) is a German professional footballer who plays as a centre-forward for 2. Bundesliga club 1. FC Nürnberg. A former youth international for Ukraine, Shuranov most recently represented the Germany U21s.

Career
Shuranov made his professional debut for 1. FC Nürnberg in the 2. Bundesliga on 13 December 2020, coming on as a substitute in the 80th minute for Felix Lohkemper against Würzburger Kickers. The home match finished as a 2–1 win for Nürnberg.

References

External links
 
 
 
 

2002 births
Living people
Sportspeople from Bamberg
Footballers from Bavaria
German footballers
Germany under-21 international footballers
Ukrainian footballers
Ukraine youth international footballers
German people of Ukrainian descent
Association football forwards
1. FC Nürnberg II players
1. FC Nürnberg players
2. Bundesliga players
Regionalliga players